The Farrier F-22 is a New Zealand trailerable trimaran sailboat that was designed by Ian Farrier and first built in 2014.

Production
The design is built by Farrier Marine in New Zealand and remains in production.

Design

The Farrier F-22 is a recreational trimaran, built predominantly of fiberglass with a foam core. It has a fractional sloop rig, with a rotating mast, plumb stems, reverse transoms, a main hull transom-hung rudder controlled by a tiller and a daggerboard or optional centreboard.

The main hull has a self-draining, open transom.

A modular alcohol-fire stove and a head are both optional

The boat is normally fitted with a small outboard motor for docking and maneuvering.

Variants
Farrier F-22
Built off-shore.
Farrier F-22S
Farrier F-22R
Built in New Zealand
Farrier F-22XR
Model for dedicated class racing, under development.

Operational history

The design was named Sail magazine's winner of the "Best Boats 2019".

Naval architect Robert Perry wrote a review in Sailing Magazine in 2017, praising the details, "there is a single, deep centerboard with a board-down draft of 4 feet 11 inches. The cassette-style rudder make beaching and trailering a breeze. Board- and rudder-up draft is 12 inches. Max beam is 18 feet 1 inch. Note the flat profile to the hull through the middle then it kicks up around station 8. The main hull has that typical inverted bell shape that provides volume where you need it for accommodations and a narrow BWL for speed. There is a very clever galley module that disappears into the seatback area when not being used. This would be camping-style cruising in the F-22 but it would make a great singlehander."

In a 2019 review in Sail, Adam Cort described sailing the design, "Under sail, in near perfect conditions, we easily hit 7.5 knots and occasionally just over 8 sailing hard on the wind in just 10 knots of breeze. Bearing away and unrolling the screecher our speed shot up to 10 then 11.5 knots, eventually touching 14 as we left a wake that would have made a Volvo Ocean Race veteran proud. Yeah, she’s fast. Better still, the helm remained responsive and nicely balanced throughout, while the boat’s amas offer sufficient buoyancy to ensure you don’t have to worry about burying the bows."

See also
List of sailing boat types

Related development
Farrier F-24

References

External links

Trimarans
2010s sailboat type designs
Sailing yachts
Trailer sailers
Sailboat type designs by Ian Farrier
Sailboat types built by Farrier Marine